Bob Gibson (1935–2020) was an American baseball pitcher who was inducted into the Baseball Hall of Fame.

Bob Gibson is also the name of:

Sports
 Bob Gibson (American football) (1927–2015), former head coach of the Bowling Green University college football program, 1965–1967
 Bob Gibson (1980s pitcher) (born 1957), American baseball pitcher who played in major leagues, 1983–1987
 Bob Gibson (footballer) (1927–1989), English football centre forward active in the 1950s

Others
 Bob Gibson (musician) (1931–1996), folk musician
 Bob Gibson (artist) (1938–2010), illustrated The Beatles' 1967 album The Magical Mystery Tour

See also
Robert Gibson (disambiguation)
Rob Gibson (born 1945), Scottish politician